M62 or M-62 may refer to:

 M62 motorway, a motorway in England.
 M-62 (Michigan highway), a state highway in Michigan.
 M62 locomotive, a Soviet heavy freight diesel locomotive.
 BMW M62, a 1994 automobile engine.
 Messier 62, a globular cluster in the constellation Ophiuchus.
 Shvetsov ASh-62, an aircraft engine produced in the Soviet Union.
 M62 (camouflage), a Finnish military camouflage pattern of the year 1962 uniform.